The Cuba Street rainbow crossing is New Zealand's second rainbow pedestrian crossing - the first being launched in Queenstown in June 2018.

The Wellington crossing was installed by Wellington City Council "to show our support for the city’s LGBTQI community." It is located at the intersection of Cuba Mall and Dixon Street.  

Mayor of Wellington Justin Lester participated in painting the crossing, before launching it a few days later on 10 October 2018. The launch date was to coincide with the birthday of the late Carmen Rupe. Within weeks the crossing was defaced with tyre skid marks.

Prior to its installation, the NZ Transport Agency opposed the crossing.  It found that it breached Land Transport Rules, writing "there is a high risk of confusion and a dazzling and distracting effect." The New Zealand Police also raised safety concerns, writing that the crossing posed "risks of death and serious injury for road users - pedestrians in particular." Later, Justin Lester told media "I'm glad that we didn't have to get the police involved, I'm glad that I wasn't arrested out there painting the rainbow crossing."

The City Council said it was important to note that the crossing was not an official zebra crossing - "It is an art installation placed on the street between two formal signal controlled crossing points which have not been changed."

See also

 LGBT New Zealand
 Te Aro red light district

References

LGBT culture in New Zealand